Lieutenant Herbert Brian Richardson  (27 May 1898 – 14 February 1922) was a British World War I flying ace credited with 15 aerial victories.

Military career
Richardson joined the Royal Flying Corps as a cadet, and was commissioned as a temporary second lieutenant (on probation) on 21 June 1917. He was confirmed in his rank and appointed a flying officer on 17 September 1917.

Richardson was posted to No. 24 Squadron in northern France to fly the SE.5a single-seat fighter, and between 18 February and 4 April 1918 was credited with nine enemy aircraft destroyed (two shared), and six driven down out of control (one shared).

His award of the Military Cross was gazetted on 21 June 1918, his citation reading:
Temporary Second Lieutenant Herbert Brian Richardson, General List and Royal Flying Corps.
"For conspicuous gallantry and devotion to duty. While on patrol he attacked a formation of eight enemy aeroplanes, one of which he destroyed. On another occasion he engaged two enemy two-seater machines, and destroyed one of them. He has destroyed six enemy machines and driven down five others out of control, and has done valuable work in attacking enemy troops on the ground. He consistently displayed great courage and skill."

Richardson was transferred to the RAF's unemployed list on 10 June 1919, but briefly returned to active service, being granted a short service commission with the rank of flying officer on 23 September 1920, which he resigned on 18 May 1921.

Richardson was killed in a flying accident in Cuatro Vientos, Spain, on 14 February 1922.

List of aerial victories

References

Bibliography
 

1898 births
1922 deaths
People from Ashford, Kent
Royal Flying Corps officers
Royal Air Force personnel of World War I
British World War I flying aces
Recipients of the Military Cross
Aviators killed in aviation accidents or incidents in Spain
Victims of aviation accidents or incidents in 1922